This is a list of custard desserts, comprising prepared desserts that use custard as a primary ingredient. Custard is a variety of culinary preparations based on a cooked mixture of milk or cream and egg or egg yolk.

Custard desserts

See also

 Blancmange – made without egg yolks
 Bavarian cream – made without egg yolks
 Panna cotta – made without egg yolks
 Eggnog
 Eierpunsch – sometimes prepared using custard as an ingredient
 List of baked goods
 List of desserts
 List of egg dishes
 Lists of prepared foods
 List of savoury puddings
 List of sweet puddings

References

External links
 
 
 

 
Custard